Ibrahim Madi (born 19 May 1998) is a professional footballer who plays as a forward for Championnat National 3 club Athlético Marseille. Born in France, he plays for the Comoros national team.

International career
Madi made his with the Comoros national team in a 2–0 2022 FIFA World Cup qualification loss to Togo on 10 September 2019.

References

External links
 
 NFT Profile

1997 births
Living people
Footballers from Marseille
Comorian footballers
French sportspeople of Comorian descent
Comoros international footballers
French footballers
Association football fullbacks
Nîmes Olympique players
FC Martigues players
Athlético Marseille players
Championnat National 2 players
Championnat National 3 players